Błaszki is a town in Sieradz County, Łódź Voivodeship, Poland, with 1,992 inhabitants as of December 2021.

History

Błaszki was founded in the 14th century.

Jewish community

1700s to Holocaust
The first historical mention of Jewish residents dates back to 1717. In the 1860s, Jewish residents accounted for 60% of the total population. Until the 1920s an estimated 400 Jewish families  and 215 Christian families resided in Blaszki. The Jewish community was frequently targeted by anti-Semitic attacks. Additionally, they were the victims of organized anti-Jewish boycotts which arranged to open a Christian shop next door or directly across from every Jewish shop. The Holocaust brought an end to this community. In september 1939, immediately after the German invasion of Poland, the Nazis arrested ten of the most important members of the community and executed them On December 20th 1939, the Błaszki Jews were transported to Łosice, Sarnaki and Sokołowo.

Legacy
In 1932 a local Zionist activist and writer , published Fun alṭn ḳloysṭer (From The Old Monastery, in Yiddish), a book of tales and legends about Błaszki and the then Kalisz County.

Notable people
 Isaac Meir Kanal (Rabbi of Blaszki 1907-1922)
Chaim Pinchas Lubinsky
 Phillip Blashki

References

External links

 Official website 
 Błaszki in the 1880 Geographical Dictionary of the Kingdom of Poland 
 Błaszki in the 1900 Geographical Dictionary of the Kingdom of Poland 
 Jewish community of Błaszki on Virtual Shtetl
 Online text of Von Dem Alten Kloster

Cities and towns in Łódź Voivodeship
Sieradz County
Kalisz Governorate
Poznań Voivodeship (1921–1939)